Viktor (Vito) Kolelishvili (born 9 October 1989) is a Georgian rugby union player. His position is flanker, and he currently plays for Clermont Auvergne in the Top 14 and the Georgia national team. He played for Georgia in the 2011 Rugby World Cup.

Viktor Kolelishvili started his career in Tbilisi, with the club Lelo Tbilisi. He plays for the Lelo's first team in the Georgia Championship very young and impresses both in attack and defence. He is called up by the Georgia national team for the 2008 IRB Nations Cup and hold his first cap at only 18 years old against Italy A.
In 2011, he moved to the French side ASM Clermont Auvergne and won the U23 championship. Few months later, he joins the Georgian squad to play the 2011 RWC and took part of games against Scotland and Argentina.
He played his first Top 14 game in May 2012 against Castres. For the 2013-2014 season, he joined Lyon OU, loaned by Clermont. After an impressive season in Pro D2, he is back in Top14 with Clermont for the 2014-2015 season by suffered of an ACL injury and was out for the rest of the season.

His very rough playing style have led Kolelishvili to collect eight yellow cards in his international career, matched in this unenviable record only by the Australian Michael Hooper.

References

1989 births
Living people
Rugby union players from Georgia (country)
Rugby union players from Tbilisi
ASM Clermont Auvergne players
Rugby union flankers
Expatriate rugby union players from Georgia (country)
Expatriate rugby union players in France
Expatriate sportspeople from Georgia (country) in France
Georgia international rugby union players
Lelo Saracens players